The humpbacked limia or black-barred limia (Limia nigrofasciata) is a species of poeciliid endemic indigenous to Haiti.  This species grows to a length of  SL.  Its natural habitat is in streams and lagoons, where it is associated with the cover of aquatic plants. It is also found in the aquarium trade. Males actively court and pursue females, they threaten each other, but if the males are evenly matched no damage generally results. Often, the dominant male will harass smaller males until they expire, so often, that only one male will survive in a colony. They are closely related to the "Tiger" limia.

References 

Humpbacked limia
Vertebrates of Haiti
Taxa named by Charles Tate Regan
Fish described in 1913